Nikopol (from ) is a city and municipality (hromada) in Nikopol District in the south of Ukraine, on the right bank of the Dnieper River, about 63 km south-east of Kryvyi Rih and 48 km south-west of Zaporizhzhia. Population: 

Nikopol is the fourth-most populous city in Dnipropetrovsk Oblast. Located on a cape by the Kakhovka reservoir, Nikopol is a powerful industrial city which has several pipe producing factories (known for the Interpipe corporation), steel rolling mills (such as the factory of ferroalloys) and others. 

Renamed by the Russian Empire into Slaviansk and later Nikopol, the city has a rich preceding history being in 1638–1652 the settlement of Mykytyn Rih, the capital of Zaporizhian Sich. It was one of the main crossings over the Dnieper.

Encyclopedia Britannica description
The 1911 edition of Encyclopedia Britannica gave the following description of Nikopol:
"It was formerly called Mykytyn Rih, and occupies an elongated peninsula between two arms of the Dnieper at a point where its banks are low and marshy, and has been for centuries one of the places where the middle Dnieper can most conveniently be crossed."

In 1900, its 21,282 inhabitants were Ukrainians, Jews and Mennonites, who carry on agriculture and shipbuilding. The old Sich, or fortified camp of the Zaporozhian Cossacks, brilliantly described in N. V. Gogol's novel Taras Bulba (1834), was situated a little higher up the river. A number of graves in the vicinity recall the battles which were fought for the possession of this important strategic point. One of the graves, close to the town, contained, along with other Scythian antiquities, a well-known precious vase representing the capture of wild horses. Even now Nikopol, which is situated on the highway from Dnipro to Kherson, is the point where the "salt-highway" of the Chumaks (Ukrainian salt-carriers) to the Crimea crossed the Dnipro. Nikopol is, further, one of the chief places on the lower Dnieper for the export of corn, linseed, hemp and wool.

History

Archaeological excavations

According to archaeological excavations, the city's area was populated as early as the Neolithic epoch in the 4th millennium BCE as evidenced by remnants of a settlement discovered on banks of Mala Kamianka River. In burial mounds of copper-bronze epoch in the 3rd-1st millenniums BCE were found stone and bronze tools, clay sharp-bottomed ornamental dishes. Here also were researched burials of Scythian-Sarmatian period in the 2nd century BCE – the 2nd century CE.

Mykytyn Rih / Mykytyn Sich

In the beginning of 16th century in place of Nikopol appeared a river crossing over Dnieper controlled by Cossacks, Mykytyn Rih. According to a folk legend, it was established by a Cossack Mykyta Tsyhan. Under the same name the crossing is mentioned in diary of the Holy Roman Empire envoy Erich Lassota von Steblau who visited Zaporizhian Sich in 1594.

In 1638-1639 Cossacks led by F.Linchai built here a fort which is conditionally named as Mykytyn Sich. Soon due to conflict with Hetman of Zaporizhian Host, in 1652 Kosh Otaman Fedir Liutay moved the administrative seat to Chortomlyk.

By 1648, in the close proximity of today's Nikopol, Mykytyn Sich was built, renowned for the fact that it was here that Bohdan Khmelnytsky was elected as the Hetman of Ukraine, and it was here that the rebellion against the Polish–Lithuanian Commonwealth started. Until 1775, the time of the Sich sacking, it was called "Mykytyn Rih", "Mykytyn Pereviz", or simply "Mykytyne". The name rih (Ukrainian for horn) was given because the locality rose at a place reminiscing a peninsula, as it was almost surrounded by the Dnieper river (see Kryvyi Rih). Mykytyne was a town of the Kodak Palanka, an administrative division of the Zaporizhian Sich. Later it was renamed into Slovianske and then Nikopol.

Sloviansk / Nikopol
In the 18th century Grigoriy Potyomkin ordered to build an Imperial Russian fortress Slaviansk, but eventually the project was scratched and soon after the liquidation of the Zaporozhian Sich in 1782 the settlement was renamed as Nikopol. 

During World War II, Nikopol was occupied by the German Army until 18 February 1944. Albert Speer referred to it as the "center of manganese mining", and therefore of vital importance to the German war effort.

In 1956 the Soviet policy of industrialization created the Kakhovka Reservoir, submerging what could be now the most sacred place of an early distinctly Ukrainian statehood: the lands of the former Zaporizhian Host, with their burial sites.

Until 18 July 2020, Nikopol was incorporated as a city of oblast significance and served as the administrative center of Nikopol Raion though it did not belong to the raion. In July 2020, as part of the administrative reform of Ukraine, which reduced the number of raions of Dnipropetrovsk Oblast to seven, the city of Nikopol was merged into Nikopol Raion.

Just a few kilometres west of the city, the Kosh otaman Ivan Sirko is buried.

Nowadays Nikopol is one of the largest towns in the region, with a population of 120,774 (2013). The largest manufacturers are the former Nikopol Tube Plant, established in 1931, which is now divided into smaller plants (e.g. Centravis, Interpipe Niko Tube), and Nikopol Ferroalloy Plant, which is the largest in Europe and second in the world in producing Ferromanganese (FeMn) and Ferrosilicomanganese (FeSiMn). There is bus station, railway station and river port, which connect the town with other cities.

Climate

Industry

Nikopol River Port facilitates transportation for the metallurgical industry and travel.

Culture

Sports
FC Nikopol
FC Metalurh Nikopol

Gallery

International relations

Twin towns — Sister cities
Nikopol is twinned with:
 Lloydminster, Canada

References

External links

Official city website 

 
Zaporozhian Sich historic sites
Cities in Dnipropetrovsk Oblast
Yekaterinoslav Governorate
Populated places established in 1639
Cities of regional significance in Ukraine
Populated places established in the Russian Empire
Populated places of Kakhovka Reservoir
Khmelnytsky Uprising
Populated places on the Dnieper in Ukraine